Kinnaman is a surname. Notable people with the surname include:

Joel Kinnaman (born 1979), Swedish-American actor
Melanie Kinnaman (born 1953), American dancer and actress
Melinda Kinnaman (born 1971), Swedish-American actress